Kevin Fischnaller (born 2 December 1993 in Brixen, Italy) is an Italian luge athlete who has competed in the Luge World Cup for Italy since 2011.

During the 2014-15 Luge World Cup he won a bronze at Iglis in the men's spirit event.  On 25 November 2017, during the 2017-18 Luge World Cup season, Fischnaller won his first world cup race, taking the gold at Winterberg. He placed ninth in the 2017 FIL World Luge Championships – Men's sprint event.
Fischnaller competed for Italy in the Men's singles luge event at the 2018 Winter Olympics in Pyeongchang. He came seventh, while his cousin Dominik came fourth.

Personal life
Kevin is the cousin of the Italian lugers Dominik Fischnaller and Hans Peter Fischnaller.

References

External links
 

Italian male lugers
1993 births
Living people
Lugers at the 2018 Winter Olympics
Olympic lugers of Italy
Sportspeople from Brixen
Italian lugers
Germanophone Italian people